Oman competed at the 1992 Summer Olympics in Barcelona, Spain.

Competitors
The following is the list of number of competitors in the Games.

Results by event

Athletics
Men's 100m metres
Ahmed Al-Moamari
 Heat — 11.58 (→ did not advance, 77th place)

Men's 800m metres
Abdullah Mohamed Al-Anbari
 Heat — 1:50.72 (→ did not advance)

References

Official Olympic Reports

Nations at the 1992 Summer Olympics
1992
1992 in Omani sport